Louis Takairangi is an Australian former professional rugby league footballer who played in the 1980s. He played for Parramatta in the NSWRL competition.

Background
Takairangi is the father of former Sydney Roosters, Gold Coast, Parramatta and Hull Kingston Rovers player Brad Takairangi.

Playing career
Takairangi made his first grade debut for Parramatta in round 2 of the 1987 NSWRL season against Western Suburbs. He played a further two games for the club and scored his only try against the Illawarra Steelers in round 10 of the competition.

References

Parramatta Eels players
Australian rugby league players
Rugby league wingers
Year of birth missing (living people)
Living people